"Midnight Rain" is a song by Taylor Swift from the 2022 album Midnights.

Midnight Rain may also refer to: 

 "Midnight Rain", a song by Amerie from the 2018 EP After 4AM
 Midnight Rain, a 2004 novel by Holly Lisle